The psychology of climate change denial is the study of why humans engage in climate change denial, despite the scientific consensus on anthropogenic climate change. The number of people denying climate change was increasing (in 2014), contrary to the increasing volume of scientific evidence and the consensus of scientists that anthropogenic climate change is occurring. Several psychological barriers have been proposed to account for this phenomenon: Distance in time, space, and influence, framing, dissonance, political worldview, cultural theory, limited cognition, age differences, ideologies, comparison with others, sunk costs, views of others and perceived risk, limited behavior, conspiratorial beliefs.

Psychological barriers 
Various psychological factors can impact the effectiveness of communication about climate change, driving potential climate change denial. Psychological barriers such as emotions and opinions refer to the internal beliefs that a person has and is stopping them from completing a certain action in this case climate change. Psychological barriers refer to our emotions, opinions, morals, etc. In an article by Gifford R., he said "we are hindered by seven categories of psychological barriers, also known as dragons of inaction: limited cognition about the problem, ideological worldviews that tend to preclude pro-environmental attitudes and behavior, comparisons with key other people, sunk costs and behavioral momentum, discordance toward experts and authorities, perceived risk of change, and positive but inadequate behavior change". People don’t necessarily always put these barriers up. But in a way, set up themselves for doubt and fear of change. Fear is an emotion we all are clear with and understand what it is, fear is an “unpleasant emotion caused by the belief that someone or something is dangerous, likely to cause pain or a threat.” This is a barrier for most people when it comes to climate change because they are afraid of change because they believe it will be damaging to their life. 
People are told that the  cause of needing climate change is because of things that we do to the environment.  We do certain things that are to blame for the need for climate change. We hear and sometimes accept it  yet we choose not to make a change or believe in “climate change”. An example would be that, in Iceland, "… Motives predict the purchasing fireworks and the opposition to mitigating action. Noticing public warnings regarding fireworks pollution did not significantly relate to the purchase behavior. The awareness of the harmful effects of firework pollution was, however, the biggest predictor of the support for mitigating action. Despite describing the pleasure derived from fireworks, 57% of the sample favored stricter government regulation, and 27% favored banning the public purpose of fireworks to 'protect them from what they want'."

Distance in time, space, and influence 
Climate change is often portrayed as occurring in the future, whether that be the near or distant future. Many estimations portray climate change effects as occurring by 2050 or 2100, which both seem much more distant in time than they really are, which can create a barrier to acceptance. There is also a barrier created by the distance portrayed in climate change discussions. Effects caused by climate change across the planet do not seem concrete to people living thousands of miles away, especially if they are not experiencing any effects. Climate change is also a complex, abstract concept to many, which can create barriers to understanding. Carbon dioxide is an invisible gas, and it causes changes in overall average global temperatures, both of which are difficult, if not impossible, for one single person to discern. Due to these distances in time, space, and influence, climate change becomes a far-away, abstract issue that does not demand immediate attention.

Framing 
In popular climate discourse framing, the three dominant framing ideas have been apocalypse, uncertainty and high costs/losses. These framings create intense feelings of fear and doom and helplessness. Framing climate change in these ways creates thoughts that nothing can be done to change the trajectory, that any solution will be too expensive and do too little, or that it is not worth trying to find a solution to something we are unsure is happening. Climate change has been framed this way for years, and so these messages are instilled in peoples’ minds, elicited whenever the words “climate change” are brought up.

Dissonance 
Because there is little solid action that people can take on a daily basis to combat climate change, then some believe climate change must not be as pressing an issue as it is made out to be. An example of this phenomenon is that most people know smoking cigarettes is not healthy, yet people continue to smoke cigarettes, and so an inner discomfort is elicited by the contradiction in ‘thinking’ and ‘doing’. A similar cognitive dissonance is created when people know that things like driving, flying, and eating meat are causing climate change, but the infrastructure is not in place to change those behaviors effectively.

In order to address this dissonance, climate change is rejected or downplayed. This dissonance also fuels denial, wherein people cannot find a solution to an anxiety-inducing problem, and so the problem is denied outright. Creating stories that climate change is actually caused by something out of humans’ control, such as sunspots or natural weather patterns, or suggesting that we must wait until we are certain of all of the facts about climate change before any action be taken, are manifestations of this fear and consequent denial of climate change."It seems as if people stop paying attention to global climate change when they realize that there are no easy solutions for it. Many people instead judge as serious only those problems for which they think action can be found.”Individuals are alarmed about the dangerous potential futures resulting from a high-energy world in which climate change was occurring, but simultaneously create denial mechanisms to overcome the dissonance of knowing these futures, yet not wanting to change their convenient lifestyles. These denial mechanisms include things like overestimating the costs of changing their lifestyles, blaming others, including government, rather than their own inaction, and emphasizing the doubt that individual action could make a difference within a problem so large.

Political worldview 
In the United States, climate change acceptance or denial is largely based on political affiliation. This is partially caused by the idea that Democrats focus more on tighter government regulations and taxation, which are the basis for most environmental policy. Political affiliation also affects how different people interpret the same facts. The more highly educated an individual is, the more likely they are to rely on their own interpretation and political ideology rather than rely on scientists’ opinions. Therefore, political world views override expert opinion on the interpretation of climate facts and evidence of anthropogenic climate change. Another reason for the discrepancy in climate change denial between liberals and conservatives is the idea that “contemporary environmental discourse is based largely on moral concerns related to harm and care, which are more deeply held by liberals than by conservatives,” whereas if the discourse were framed using moral concerns related to purity that are more deeply held by conservatives, the discrepancy was resolved.

Affiliation with a political group, especially in the United States, is a very important personal and social identity for many. Because of this, it is likely that an individual will carry the popular values of their political affiliation, regardless of their personal belief on the matter, solely so they are not ostracized from the group and their identity. A study of climate change denial indicators from public opinion data from ten Gallup surveys from 2001 to 2010 shows that conservative white males in the United States are significantly more likely to deny climate change than other Americans. Furthermore, conservative white males who reported understanding climate change very well were even more likely to deny climate change. This is further proven through another study done in Australia, that showed that when participants had their political identity made salient, through definition and characteristics of supporters, were more likely to deny climate change and reject governmental climate change policies, especially when those participants were aligned with right-wing politics.

One telltale worldview that leads to climate change denial is the belief in free enterprise capitalism. The “freedom of the commons”, or the freedom to use natural resources as a public good as it is practiced in free enterprise capitalism destroys important ecosystems and their functions, and so having a stake in this worldview does not correlate with climate change mitigation behaviors. Political worldview plays an important role in environmental policy and action (or inaction). Liberals tend to focus on environmental risks, while conservatives focus on the benefits that economic development brings. Because of these differences in world views, with one political ideology focusing on risks while the other focuses on benefits, conflicting opinions on the acceptance or denial of climate change arise.

Cultural theory 
Conservative white males are much more likely than other Americans to deny the existence of climate change according to public opinion data from Gallup surveys, and the statistical significance remains even whilst controlling for each of the direct effects of race, gender, political ideology, and other control variables. In the initial Flynn et al. study in 1994, this white male effect was due to a smaller subgroup of white males in the sample who self-reported high risk acceptance. People often cognitively process their perceptions regarding risk through their world views and as shared by their in-groups. If information that contradicts these beliefs and risks is presented by perceived out-groups, individuals tend to strongly resist any change to these aforementioned beliefs they have otherwise psychologically invested in—in this case, evidence of climate change is the information they resist.

This phenomenon has been coined as identity-protective cognition. This way of thinking allows people to preserve the self-perception benefits they retain through this perceived group membership, and thus they continue to appraise incoming information through a lens that supports beliefs associated with belonging in these groups. Kahan et al. offered strong support for this identity-protective cognition hypothesis through their multivariate analysis, noting that white males are thus likely to dismiss any reported risks of climate change and perceive reported risks of climate change as an out-group challenge to the existing hierarchy socially, politically, or economically. McCright & Dunlap also found a positive relationship between self-reported understanding of global warming and intensity of endorsement of climate change denial beliefs, which underscores the identity-protective cognition hypothesis, in that it further illustrates the system-justifying tendency present in confident, conservative white men.

Limited cognition 
Limited cognition of the human brain, caused by things like the fact that the human brain has not evolved much in thousands of years, and so has not transitioned to caring about the future rather than immediate danger, ignorance, the idea that environments are composed of more elements than humans can monitor, so we only attend to things causing immediate difficulty, which climate change does not seem to do, uncertainty, undervaluing of distant or future risk, optimism bias, and the belief that an individual can do nothing against climate change are all cognitive barriers to climate change acceptance.

Inoculation theory

This section has an excerpt from Inoculation theory

A social psychological theory that uses vaccination terminology and mechanisms to prevent spread of misinformation by “inoculating” with preemptive misinformation. The theory was developed by social psychologist William J. McGuire in 1961 to explain how attitudes and beliefs change, and more specifically, how to keep existing attitudes and beliefs consistent in the face of attempts to change them. Researched primarily relative to health, science and politics, newer research is utilizing this theory as a persuasion tactic in reducing misinformation in conspiracy theories and contested science relative to climate science, vaccination, and the COVID-19 pandemic.“Inoculation has been tested experimentally in the context of climate change. When participants were exposed to both consensus information and misinformation casting doubt on the consensus, there was  no significant change in acceptance of climate change.”

Age differences 
Youth show a deeper understanding and awareness of climate change than adults and older generations. Younger generations of people typically demonstrate more concern about climate change over older generations, and younger demographics show more negative and pessimistic attitudes towards climate change.  However, younger demographics also believe at higher rates than older demographics that climate change can be successfully mitigated by taking action, and are more likely to express interest in taking action in order to help mitigate climate change. 

About 28% of millennials say that they have taken some kind of action to help with climate change, and 40% have used social media to address climate change in some way, along with 45% of Gen Z youth.  Younger generations are also more likely to support and vote for climate change policies than older generations.

Ideologies 
Ideologies, including suprahuman powers, technosalvation, and system justification, are all psychological barriers to climate change acceptance. Suprahuman powers describes the belief that humans cannot or should not interfere because they believe a religious deity will not turn on them or will do what it wants to do regardless of their intervention. Technosalvation is the ideology that technologies such as geoengineering will save us from climate change, and so mitigation behavior is not necessary. Another ideological barrier is the ideology of system justification, or the defense and justification of the status quo, so as to not “rock the boat” on a comfortable lifestyle.

Comparison with others 
Social comparisons between individuals build social norms. These social norms then dictate how someone “should” behave in order to align with society’s ideas of “proper” behavior. This barrier also includes perceived inequity, where an individual feels they should not or do not have to act a certain way because they believe no one else acts that way.

Sunk costs 
Financial investment in fossil fuels and other climate change inducing industries is often a reason for denial of climate change. If one accepts that these things cause climate change, they would have to lose their investment, and so continued denial is more acceptable. People are also very invested in their own behavior. Behavioral momentum, or daily habits, are one of the most important barriers to remove for climate change mitigation. Lastly, conflicting values, goals, and aspirations can interfere with the acceptance of climate change mitigation. Because many of the goals held by individuals directly conflict with climate change mitigation strategies, climate change gets pushed to the bottom of their list of values, so as to minimize the extent of its conflict.

Views of others and perceived risk 
If someone is held in a negative light, it is not likely others will take guidance from them due to feelings of mistrust, inadequacy, denial of their beliefs, and reactance against statements they believe threaten their freedom.

Several types of perceived risk can occur when an individual is considering changing their behavior to accept and mitigate climate change: functional risk, physical risk, financial risk, social risk, psychological risk, and temporal risk. Due to the perception of all of these risks, the individual may just reject climate change altogether to avoid potential risks completely.

Limited behavior 
One type of limited behavior is tokenism, where after completing one small task or engaging in one small behavior, the individual feels they have done their part to mitigate climate change, when in reality they could be doing much more. Individuals could also experience the rebound effect, where one positive activity is diminished or erased by a subsequent activity (like walking to work all week because you are flying across the country every weekend).

Conspiratorial beliefs 
Climate change denial is commonly rooted in a phenomenon commonly known as conspiracy theory, in which people misattribute events to a secret plot or plan by a powerful group of individuals. The development of conspiracy theories is further prompted by the proportionality bias that results from climate change — an event of mass scale and a great deal of significance — being frequently presented as a result of daily small-scale human behavior; often, individuals are less likely to believe large events of this scale can be so easily explained by ordinary details.

This inclination is furthered by a variety of possible strong individually and socially grounded reasons to believe in these conspiracy theories. The social nature of being a human holds influential merit when it comes to information evaluation. Conspiracy theories reaffirm the idea that people are part of moral social groups that have the ability to remain firm in the face of deep-seated threats. Conspiracy theories also feed into the human desire and motivation to maintain one’s level of self-esteem, a concept known as self-enhancement. With climate change in particular, one possibility for the popularity of climate change conspiracy theories is that these theories knee-cap the reasoning that humans are culpable for the degradation of their own world and environment. This allows for maintenance of one’s own self-esteem, and provides strong backing for belief in conspiracy theories. These climate change conspiracy theories pass the social blame to others, which upholds both the self and the in-group as moral and legitimate, making them highly appealing to those who perceive a threat to the esteem of themselves or their group. In a similar vein, much like how conspiracy belief is linked with narcissism, it is also predicted by collective narcissism. Collective narcissism is a belief in the distinction of one’s own group whilst believing that those outside the group do not give the group enough recognition.

A variety of factors related to the nature of climate change science itself also enable the proliferation of conspiratorial beliefs. Climate change is a complicated field of science for lay people to make sense of. Research has experimentally indicated that people are used to creating patterns where there are none when they perceive a loss of control in order to return the world to one they can make sense of. Research indicates that people hold stronger beliefs about conspiracies when they exhibit distress as a consequence of uncertainty, which are both prominent when it comes to climate change science. Additionally, in order to meet the psychological desire for clear, cognitive closure, the likes of is not consistently accessible to lay people regarding climate change, people often lean on conspiracy theories. Bearing this in mind, it is also crucial to note that conspiracy belief is conversely lessened in intensity when individuals have their sense of control affirmed.

People with certain cognitive tendencies are also more drawn to conspiracy theories about climate change as compared to others. Aside from narcissism as previously mentioned, conspiratorial beliefs are more predominantly found in those who consistently look for meanings or patterns in their world, which often includes those who believe in paranormal activities. Climate change conspiracy disbelief is also linked with lower levels of education and analytic thinking. If a person has a predisposed inclination towards perceiving others’ actions as having been actively done willfully even when no such thing is happening, they are more likely to buy into conspiratorial thinking.

Though there are numerous different specific conspiracy theories regarding climate change, there are a few consistent examples found as denoted by researchers Douglas and Sutton. Some people believe that fabricating the existence of climate change for purposes of exerting political influence, while others believe that it is being fabricated in order to alarm governments into financially supporting future research. Some people believe that climate change is a scam on behalf of environmental groups that have bribed scientists in order to protect their financial interests in renewable energy. As referenced in “The Great Global Warming Swindle” documentary from 2007, some believe global warming is a conspiracy crafted in order to promote interests in the nuclear sector.

The global COVID-19 pandemic has contributed to the increase of conspiratorial beliefs, contested science, skepticism, and overall denial of climate science. Researchers studying science skepticism of vaccination for COVID-19 see direct linkages between this and science skepticism for other large scale domain issues like that of climate science. Rise in contested science and misinformation in the global pandemic has had harmful effects for some, those for example that have ingested Hydroxychloroquine because of widespread misinformation.“COVID has opened everyone’s eyes to the dangers of health misinformation.”

Threat to self-interest 
The realisation that an individual’s actions contribute to climate change can threaten their self-interest and compromise their psychological integrity. The threat to self-interest can often result in ‘denialism’- a refusal to accept and even deny the scientific evidence- manifested across all levels of society. Large organisations that have a strong vested interest in activities directly responsible for climate change, such as fossil fuel companies, may even promote climate change denial through the spread of misinformation.

Denial is manifested at the individual level where it is used to protect the self from overwhelming emotional responses to climate change. This is often referred to as ‘soft denial’ or ‘disavowal’ in the relevant literature. Here the dangers of climate change are experienced in a purely intellectual way, resulting in no psychological disturbance: cognition is split off from feeling. Disavowal can be induced by a wide variety of psychological processes including: the diffusion of responsibility, rationalisation, perceptual distortion, wishful thinking and projection. These are all avoidant ways of coping.

See also
 Barriers to pro-environmental behavior

References 

Cognitive biases
 
Environmental psychology